Sri Hirudhayaleeswarar sivan temple is a Hindu temple, located at Thirunindravur, Chennai, India.

This temple has a HEREDITARY TRUSTEE which was formed in 1929 by a leading industrialist Mr.P.S.Sathappa Chettiar (late), son of Diwan Bahadur P. SOMASUNDARAM CHETTIAR (late), from Coimbatore. This trustee is maintained by his successors, with the current trustee being the great grandson of Mr. P.S.Sathappa chettiar,  Mr. Jagan Somasundaram Sathappan.

Legend

Thirunindravur, Chennai once saw the outpour of devotion of a devout heart as well as the reciprocated grace as a result of the intense devotion. Poosalaar, was a poor man in terms of material wealth but rich in dedicated devotion towards Lord Shiva. His heart brimmed with love and devotion for the Lord. He was called Poosalaar as his body was always smeared with the sacred ash, (Tamil-Poosu-Apply). Bhagavan Ramana says that the right kind of desire on the spiritual path will condition an aspirant to become one with the divine ultimately. Poosalaar was not an exception to this and he yearned to erect a beautiful temple for his heart's favourite. However he became the object of people's ridicule for his herculean desire in his impoverished condition.

Poosalaar however was not deterred by the words of the people. His heart was large enough to house Shiva's temple and his love served to implement the task with ease. Meanwhile, Rajasimha Pallava, the King of Kanchi had undertaken the task of erecting a temple for Lord Shiva. On the completion of the task, the king wanted it to be named Rajasimeswaram and duly consecrated. Hence the king fixed a date for the consecration. The day before the assigned date the king's heart was brimming with pride of having erected a beautiful temple for the Lord as his eyes shut with his thoughts vanishing into his sleep. The Lord appeared in his dream and stated that He will not be able make present Himself in the consecration ceremony as He will be present in the consecration ceremony of another temple built by an ardent devotee, Poosalaar. Hence the king was asked by the Lord to choose another date to have Him installed ceremoniously on another day in the temple built by him.

The surprised king immediately commanded the culmination of the ceremonies associated with the temple consecration and proceeded to check out on the temple of Poosalaar. Coming to know that Poosalaar lived in a nearby town he set out towards Thirunindravur. The king was perplexed on the results of his enquiry that Poosalaar lived in poverty and there was not a sign of a new temple being erected in Thirunindravur. Counting on the Lord's words, the King sought to meet Poosalaar who was meditating under a tree. The king approached Poosalaar and stated the purpose of his visit. Poosalaar replied with joy to have a look at the ceremonious installation of Lord Shiva in the temple that he had built. Lo and Behold! The king witnessed the consecration ceremony of the temple built by Poosalaar within the heart of Poosalaar, with the chanting of the Vedas and other ceremonial activities!

It was then that the king realized that the poor devotee had visualized his desire stage by stage within his heart, surrendering his will and wish to his beloved Lord. The pure devotion and the unconditional love for the Lord had led the almighty to be enshrined in his heart forever. The king then materialized the temple that Poosalaar had built in the cavern of his heart before having the temple built by him duly consecrated. He called the deity 'Irudhayaleeswarar', the one who abides in the heart. Poosalaar is one of the sixty three Nayanmars stated in the Periyapuranam.

Temple
Thirunindravur, the place where the temple of Hridayaleeswarar is situated is located in the Thiruvallur district of Tamil Nadu near Chennai. The inner roof of the temple is fashioned like that of a heart divided into four compartments probably displaying Poosalaar's conception. Parvati here is worshipped as Maragathambigai. Poosalaar's statue is found with folded hands in the shrine of Irudhayaleeeswarar. Irudhayaleeswarar is also worshipped as Manavaleswarar. People with an ailing heart is said to flock to this temple for speedy recovery due to Irudhayaleeswarar's grace.

The story of this temple states that the Lord surrenders to the ambit of a devotee's pure devotion and not extravaganza. The story symbolically represents the Vedic principle of seeking the lord within one's heart and to ultimately lose oneself in Him indivisibly which is what is realization. Poosalaar sought the Lord within Himself which led to His liberation from the cycle of birth and death. In the words of Ramana Maharshi, the greatest form of bakti or devotion is to find and identify Him within oneself to destroy even the least distance between Him and the one seeking to.

Hindu temples in Tiruvallur district